Harper Allen is a Canadian writer of contemporary and fantasy romance novels since 1998.

Biography
Allen is of Irish ancestry and works as a court reporter for the judicial system.  She is a four-time nominee for a Career Achievement Award by Romantic Times Book Reviews magazine.  Her novel Dressed To Slay was named the magazine's choice for Best Silhouette Bombshell of 2006.

She is married and they have numerous pets.

Bibliography

Single novels
The Man That Got Away - Apr 1998
Twice Tempted - Dec 1999
Woman Most Wanted - Jan 2001
Protector With A Past - Jun 2001
The Night In Question - Sep 2002
McQueen's Heat - Jan 2003
Covert Cowboy - Nov 2003

The Avengers series
Guarding Jane Doe - Aug 2001
Sullivan's Last Stand - Sep 2001
The Bride And The Mercenary - May 2002

Men Of The Double B Ranch series
Lone Rider Bodyguard - Feb 2004
Desperado Lawman - Mar 2004
Shotgun Daddy - Apr 2004

Darkheart & Crosse series
Dressed To Slay - Oct 2006
Vampaholic - Nov 2006
Dead Is The New Black - Jan 2007

Athena Force Adventure series Multi-Author
9. Payback - Mar 2005

References

External links
Publisher Website
Romancewiki Entry
Harper Allen in Fantastic Fiction
Biography in ereader

Canadian romantic fiction writers
Living people
Year of birth missing (living people)